Gaz Saleh, also rendered as Gaz Sala or Gesaleh or Jezsaleh, may refer to:
 Gaz Saleh-e Olya
 Gaz Saleh-e Sofla